Calliari is an Italian surname. Notable people with the surname include:

Amedeo Calliari, (born 1988), Italian footballer
Marco Calliari, Canadian singer-songwriter
Orietta Calliari, (born 1969), Italian ski mountaineer

Italian-language surnames